Felipe Henrique Jose dos Santos (born 8 July 1993, in Araraquara), known as Felipe Fumaça or simply Felipe, is a Brazilian football player who plays for Olímpia SP.

He made his debut in the Russian Football National League for FC Luch-Energiya Vladivostok on 14 March 2015 in a game against FC Tyumen.

References

External links
 Profile by Russian Football National League
 
 Felipe Fumaca at ZeroZero

1993 births
People from Araraquara
Living people
Brazilian footballers
Brazilian expatriate footballers
Atlético Monte Azul players
Esporte Clube Comercial (MS) players
FC Luch Vladivostok players
FK Spartaks Jūrmala players
Associação Atlética Internacional (Bebedouro) players
FC Cascavel players
São Bernardo Futebol Clube players
Anápolis Futebol Clube players
Latvian Higher League players
Association football forwards
Brazilian expatriate sportspeople in Russia
Brazilian expatriate sportspeople in Latvia
Expatriate footballers in Russia
Expatriate footballers in Latvia
Footballers from São Paulo (state)